William Henry Smith, 5th Viscount Hambleden (born 18 November 1955) is a British peer, and descendant of the founders of the stationery group WH Smith.

Marriage and family
Smith is the son of William Smith and Countess Maria Carmela Attolico di Adelfia. Through his paternal grandmother, he is a descendant of the Earls of Pembroke and the Vorontsov family. He succeeded to the title of Viscount Hambleden in 2012 upon the death of his father.

Smith married American Sara Suzanne Anlauf in 1983 and had two daughters, Sara Marie Celeste (b. 1986) and Alexandra Patricia (b. 1989). He was a film producer and restaurateur. He separated from his wife in 2003 and returned to Hambleden, Buckinghamshire, England.

He is in a relationship with singer Anni-Frid Lyngstad of ABBA, who is a German princess and countess by marriage to Heinrich Reuss, who died in 1999. Smith lives with Lyngstad in Switzerland.

References

1955 births
Living people
Viscounts in the Peerage of the United Kingdom